Robert Taylor (April 29, 1763 – July 3, 1845) was a nineteenth-century politician and lawyer from Virginia.

Biography
Born in Orange Court House, Virginia, Taylor completed preparatory studies, studied law and was admitted to the bar 1783, commencing practice in Orange Court House. He held several local offices before serving in the Virginia Senate from 1804 to 1815 also serving as president pro tempore from 1812-1814. In 1824, Taylor was elected an Adams Republican to the United States House of Representatives, serving from 1825 to 1827 and not running for reelection.

Afterwards, Taylor devoted his attention to the management of his plantation and his legal practice. Taylor drafted the will of former President James Madison (a relative), whom he persuaded not to emancipate slaves, but leave instructions and allow Dolley Madison to do so in her will (which she failed to do).

Taylor died at his estate called "Meadow Farm" in Orange County, Virginia on July 3, 1845 and was interred in the family cemetery on the estate. He had married Frances Pendleton (1767-1831). Their grandson, James Taliaferro became U.S. Senator from Florida. President Zachary Taylor was another relative (having the same grandfather, who is also buried in the former Meadow Farm estate cemetery).

References

External links

1763 births
1845 deaths
Virginia state senators
Virginia lawyers
19th-century American politicians
National Republican Party members of the United States House of Representatives from Virginia
People from Orange, Virginia
19th-century American lawyers